The Rolls-Royce Silver Seraph was a large luxury automobile produced by Rolls-Royce Motors from 1998 to 2002. First unveiled on 3 March 1998 at the Geneva Motor Show, it replaced the Silver Spirit, which ended production in 1997. Silver Seraph production was discontinued when the licence to use the Rolls-Royce marque was sold to BMW, which began manufacture of an unrelated line of vehicles under a new corporation, Rolls-Royce Motor Cars.

Development 
Development of the Silver Seraph began in the late 1980s, with design work commencing in October 1990. By April 1991, the conceptual design was frozen and approved by the management in June 1991. After several refinements were made, the definitive design was reached in 1994. On 28 July 1995 design patents were filed for both the Rolls-Royce Silver Seraph and Bentley Arnage utilizing production design prototypes as representations. Development concluded after nearly a decade in late 1997, with pilot production models being produced into early 1998 bearing R396 DTU registration plates. The Silver Seraph was launched at the 1998 Geneva Motor Show.

Description 
Aside from the radiator grille, badges and wheels, the Seraph was externally identical to the contemporary Bentley Arnage, sharing both its platform and body shell. It was powered by the BMW M73 engine, a 5.4L aluminium alloy V12 engine coupled to a 5-speed automatic transmission, making it the first twelve-cylinder Rolls-Royce since the 1939 Phantom III. The car conforms to the Euro III emission standards.

The body was 65 percent stiffer than that of its predecessor. Standard electronics included digital engine management, adaptive ride control and anti-lock brakes. The exterior was available in one and two-tone finishes.

Inside, the Rolls-Royce Silver Seraph and the Bentley Arnage were similar yet distinct. The Seraph's gear selector was column-mounted, and gauges followed a traditional Rolls-Royce layout. In both cars, the seats and dashboard were upholstered in Connolly Leather, with dashboard trim and folding picnic trays for rear passengers faced with glossy burl walnut veneer.

The Seraph was known for its relatively limited acceleration and comfortable handling, in comparison to the Arnage, which had a twin turbocharged V8 of its own design and firmer suspension.

The RAC gave the car a rating of 7.6/10, stating "The Silver Seraph marks a new start for Rolls-Royce in their quest to once more be recognised as manufacturers of the world's best cars. And it's quite a credible effort.

Production 
All Seraphs were hand-built at the Rolls-Royce factory in Crewe, England. The car had a base price of £155,175 in the UK and $220,695 in the US. It was second in cost and exclusivity only to the Rolls-Royce Corniche, though it was the cheapest Rolls-Royce per se after the discontinuation of the Silver Spur.

A total of 1,570 Silver Seraphs were produced before manufacture ceased in 2002 with the last 170 cars being under the "Last of Line" Specification. (Distinguished by Fender badges, Commemorative Plaque, Chromed Mirror caps, Spirit of Ecstasy Hubcaps & Red Rolls Royce badging)

Park Ward model 
An extended wheelbase 5-passenger version of the Silver Seraph called the Park Ward debuted at the 2000 Geneva Motor Show. Introduced for the 2001 model year, it had  added to the size of the doors (mostly the rear), resulting in more leg room for passengers. Rolls-Royce initially planned to build 200 of the model. However, it was discontinued after 2002, with a total of 127 having been produced. It was the last model to use the Park Ward label.

Gallery

References

External links

 Rolls-Royce Silver Seraph
 Silver Seraph Reviews

Silver Seraph
Full-size vehicles
Rear-wheel-drive vehicles
Sedans
2000s cars
Cars introduced in 1998
Limousines